Dr. Havilah Beardsley House is a historic home located at Elkhart, Elkhart County, Indiana.  It was built in 1848, and is a two-story, rectangular, Italianate style brick dwelling.  It has a medium pitched gable roof, full width front porch with Ionic order fluted columns, rounded openings, and decorative brackets.  It has later flanking one-story, flat roofed wings.  It was built by Havilah Beardsley, founder of the city of Elkhart. The house is operated as a historic house museum as part of the Ruthmere Mansion complex.

It was added to the National Register of Historic Places in 2000.  It is located in the Beardsley Avenue Historic District.

References

Historic house museums in Indiana
Houses on the National Register of Historic Places in Indiana
Italianate architecture in Indiana
Houses completed in 1848
Houses in Elkhart County, Indiana
National Register of Historic Places in Elkhart County, Indiana
1848 establishments in Indiana
Museums in Elkhart County, Indiana
Buildings and structures in Elkhart, Indiana
Historic district contributing properties in Indiana